Wilhelmus Simon Petrus Fortuijn, known as Pim Fortuyn (19 February 1948 – 6 May 2002), was a Dutch politician, author, civil servant, businessman, sociologist and academic who founded the party Pim Fortuyn List (Lijst Pim Fortuyn or LPF) in 2002.

Fortuyn worked as a professor at the Erasmus University of Rotterdam before branching into a business career and was an advisor to the Dutch government on social infrastructure. He then became prominent in the Netherlands as a press columnist, writer and media commentator.

Initially a Marxist who was sympathetic to the Communist Party of the Netherlands, and later a member of the Dutch Labour Party in the 1970s, Fortuyn's beliefs began to shift to the right in the 1990s, especially related to the immigration policies of the Netherlands. Fortuyn criticised multiculturalism, immigration and Islam in the Netherlands. He called Islam "a backward culture", and was quoted as saying that if it were legally possible, he would close the borders for Muslim immigrants. Fortuyn also supported tougher measures against crime and opposed state bureaucracy, wanting to reduce the Dutch financial contribution to the European Union. He was labelled a far-right populist by his opponents and in the media, but he fiercely rejected this label. Fortuyn was openly homosexual and a supporter of gay rights.

Fortuyn explicitly distanced himself from "far-right" politicians such as the Belgian Filip Dewinter, Austrian Jörg Haider, or Frenchman Jean-Marie Le Pen whenever compared to them. While he compared his own politics to centre-right politicians such as Silvio Berlusconi of Italy and Edmund Stoiber of Germany, he also admired former Dutch Prime Minister Joop den Uyl, a social democrat, and Democratic U.S. president John F. Kennedy. Fortuyn also criticised the polder model and the policies of the outgoing government of Wim Kok and repeatedly described himself and LPF's ideology as pragmatic and not populistic. In March 2002, his newly created LPF became the largest party in Fortuyn's hometown Rotterdam during the Dutch municipal elections held that year.

Fortuyn was assassinated during the 2002 Dutch national election campaign by Volkert van der Graaf, a left-wing environmentalist and animal rights activist. In court at his trial, van der Graaf said he murdered Fortuyn to stop him from exploiting Muslims as "scapegoats" and targeting "the weak members of society" in seeking political power. The LPF went on to poll in second place during the election but went into decline soon after.

Early life and education
Wilhelmus Simon Petrus Fortuijn was born on 19 February 1948 in Driehuis within the Dutch municipality of Velsen, as the third child to a middle class Catholic family. His father worked as a salesman and his mother was a housewife. He attended Mendelcollege secondary school in Haarlem where he was described as an academically gifted pupil. As a youth, Fortuyn initially wanted to train as a priest, but in 1967 he began to study sociology at the University of Amsterdam and transferred after a few months to the Vrije Universiteit in Amsterdam. In 1971 he ended his study with the Academic degree Doctorandus. In 1981 he received a doctorate in sociology at the University of Groningen as a Doctor of Philosophy.

Career

Professional career

Fortuyn worked as a lecturer at the Nyenrode Business Universiteit and as an associate professor at the University of Groningen, where he taught Marxist sociology. He was also an employee of the Groningen University Newspaper for which he wrote columns. He was a Marxist at the time and sympathized with the Communist Party of the Netherlands (CPN), although he never became a full member. Later, he joined the Labour Party.

In 1989 Fortuyn became director of a government organisation administering student transport cards and worked as an advisor to the Social and Economic Council (SER). In 1990 he moved to Rotterdam. From 1991 to 1995, he was an extraordinary professor at the Erasmus University Rotterdam, appointed to the Albeda-chair in "employment conditions in public service" and ran an education consultancy business.

When his contract ended, he made a career of public speaking, writing books and press columns, and worked as a weekly columnist for Elsevier. He gradually involved himself in politics through regularly appearing on televised debate shows and became a familiar public figure for his charismatic and flamboyant speaking style. Fortuyn was openly gay, and said in a 2002 interview that he was Catholic.

Political career

Fortuyn began his political career on the left and was initially a Marxist due to an aversion to the Dutch political establishment which he described as dominated by pillarization and a "regent mentality." He was sympathetic to the Dutch Communist Party but chose not to become a member due to personal disagreements with the party leadership and self-identified as a Marxist without becoming active in any communist organisations. In the 1970s he joined the Labour Party and became a social democrat. In 1986, his views shifted towards neoliberalism in the hope that the free market would lead to further individual emancipation, ending a perceived oppression by state bureaucracy. In 1991, he proposed firing half of all civil servants and promoted privatisation and decentralisation. In 1992, Fortuyn wrote Aan het volk van Nederland ("To the people of the Netherlands"), in which he declared himself to be the spiritual successor of the charismatic but controversial 18th-century Dutch patriot politician Joan Derk van der Capellen tot den Pol. The book urges the already culturally emancipated citizen to use the free market to also liberate himself economically, from the welfare state. In 1989, Fortuyn left the Labour Party and during the 1990s became a member of the centre-right VVD and was briefly a political consultant to the Christian Democratic Appeal in the early 2000s.

Though on economic matters Fortuyn would largely remain a neoliberal, culturally he soon became strongly influenced by the neoconservative political philosopher and chief editor of the weekly Elsevier Hendrik Jan Schoo who made him a columnist in 1993. Schoo deplored that a progressive new class would have promoted multiculturalism, founding an anti-racist civil religion on article 1 of the Dutch constitution, forbidding discrimination. Whereas in the early 1990s Fortuyn had held liberal views on immigration, this changed under the influence of Schoo.

Dutch neocons understood that in the evermore secularising Netherlands a change on the lines of the Reagan Revolution had become highly improbable. Women's rights, gay rights, abortion and euthanasia had been generally accepted. In his 1995 book De verweesde samenleving ("The orphaned society"), Fortuyn claimed that the progressive movement of the 1960s had eroded traditional norms and values. Both the roles of the "symbolic father" and the "caring mother" had been lost, leaving an orphaned population without guidance, to live out a meaningless decadent existence. However, Fortuyn did not propose a return to old socially conservative or Dutch Calvinist and iconoclastic values and argued that the media, schools and artists should provide a moral leadership, explicitly promoting and defending the new values of modern Western society, constantly recreating the Dutch identity. Fortuyn consistently retained a liberal stance on matters such as LGBT rights throughout his political career.

Adopting the philosophical analysis by Carl Schmitt, it was assumed that such an identity could only be defined in antithesis to some actually existing concrete enemy. Inspired by Samuel Huntington's The Clash of Civilizations, Dutch ethnicity was to be re-invented by identifying that enemy as Islam. In his 1997 book Tegen de islamisering van onze cultuur ("Against the islamisation of our culture"), Fortuyn proposed that after the fall of communism a new adversary would be found in Muslim culture. Fortuyn explained the global fundamentalist wave of the 1990s as a backlash against the insecurities caused by globalisation. The Dutch should counter Islamic fundamentalism by promoting and defending their own fundament, Dutch culture, especially modernism and the Enlightenment values. These should not yet be imposed on the Dutch population as a whole, with the exception of immigrants. Whereas American neoconservatives promoted hard power policies in relation to the Muslim world, Dutch neocons favoured a soft power approach. Shortly before the September 11 attacks, Fortuyn called for a Cold War against Islam, meaning a non-military defensive enmity. The attacks and the War on Terror made Islam a main issue in Dutch politics for the first time.

Fortuyn announced his intention to run for parliament in a television interview in 2001, although he did not specify which party he would seek to stand as a candidate with. Although he was already in contact with the newly formed Livable Netherlands (LN) party, he also considered running for the Christian Democratic Appeal which he had worked as a consultant for, or even creating his own list. Livable Netherlands founder Jan Nagel subsequently invited him to run as party leader and Fortuyn was elected "lijsttrekker"  (lead candidate) by a large majority of party members at the LN conference on 26 November 2001, prior to the Dutch general election of 2002. In his leadership bid and general election campaign, Fortuyn attacked the mainstream parties on multiculturalism, immigration and law & order. He also called for less government interference and for a reform of the Dutch public health and education systems. He concluded his acceptance speech by saying the words in English that would become his slogan; "At your service!" Support for LN rose dramatically during Fortuyn's brief leadership, climbing from 2% in opinion polls to about 17%.

On 9 February 2002, Fortuyn gave an interview to Volkskrant, a Dutch newspaper (see below) regarding his beliefs on immigration and Islam. His statements were considered so controversial that LN dismissed him as lijsttrekker the next day. Against the advice of his campaign team, Fortuyn said in the interview that he favoured closing borders to Muslim immigrants and if possible he would abolish the "peculiar article" of the Dutch constitution forbidding discrimination (at the time it was generally assumed that he referred to Article 1, the equality before the law; it has been argued, however, that Fortuyn and the interviewer had confused this with Article 137 of the Penal Code, incitement to hatred).

Founding the LPF
Having been rejected by Livable Netherlands, Fortuyn founded his own party Pim Fortuyn List (LPF) on 11 February 2002, taking many former LN members and supporters with him.

Heading the list of the Livable Rotterdam party, considered to be the local counterpart of the LPF, he achieved a major victory in the Rotterdam municipal council elections in early March 2002. The new party won about 36% of the seats, making it the largest party in the council. For the first time since the Second World War, the Labour Party was out of power in Rotterdam.

Fortuyn's victory made him the subject of hundreds of interviews during the next three months, and he made many statements about his political ideology. In March he released his book The Mess of Eight Purple Years (De puinhopen van acht jaar Paars), which criticised the current political system in the Netherlands and was used as his political agenda for the upcoming general election. Purple is the colour to indicate a coalition government consisting of left parties (red) and conservative-liberal parties (blue). The Netherlands had been governed by such a coalition for eight years at that time.

On 14 March 2002, Fortuyn was pied by a left-wing activist from the Biotic Baking Brigade in The Hague. As a result, Fortuyn began to express a fear of being injured or assassinated and accused members of the Dutch political establishment of encouraging violence against him.

Death

On 6 May 2002, at age 54, Fortuyn was assassinated by gunshot in Hilversum, North Holland, by Volkert van der Graaf. The attack took place in a car park outside a radio studio where Fortuyn had just given an interview. This was nine days before the general election, in which he was running. The attacker was pursued by Hans Smolders, Fortuyn's driver, and was arrested by the police shortly afterward, still in possession of a handgun. Months later, Van der Graaf confessed in court to the first notable political assassination in the Netherlands since 1672 (excluding World War II). On 15 April 2003, he was convicted of assassinating Fortuyn and sentenced to 18 years in prison. He was released on parole in May 2014 after serving two-thirds of his sentence, the standard procedure under the Dutch penal system.

The assassination shocked many residents of the Netherlands and highlighted the cultural clashes within the country. Various conspiracy theories arose after Pim Fortuyn's murder and deeply affected Dutch politics and society. Politicians from all parties suspended campaigning. After consultation with LPF, the government decided not to postpone the elections. As Dutch law did not permit modifying the ballots, Fortuyn became a posthumous candidate. The LPF made an unprecedented debut in the House of Representatives by winning 26 seats (17% of the 150 seats in the house). The LPF joined a cabinet with the Christian Democratic Appeal and the People's Party for Freedom and Democracy, but conflicts in the rudderless LPF quickly collapsed the cabinet, forcing new elections. By the following year, the party had lost support, winning only eight seats in the 2003 elections. It won no seats in the 2006 elections, by which time the Party for Freedom, led by Geert Wilders, had emerged as a successor.

During the last months of his life, Fortuyn had become closer to the Catholic Church. To the surprise of many commentators and Dutch TV hosts, Fortuyn insisted on Fr. Louis Berger, a parish priest from The Hague, accompanying him in some of his last TV appearances. According to the New York Times, Berger had become his "friend and confessor" during the last weeks of his life.

Fortuyn was initially buried in Driehuis in the Netherlands. He was re-interred on 20 July 2002, at San Giorgio della Richinvelda, in the province of Pordenone in Italy, where he had owned a house.

Views

Islam and immigration
When asked about his opposition to Muslim immigration, Fortuyn explained that, "I have no desire to go through the emancipation of women and homosexuals all over again." In August 2001, Fortuyn was quoted in the Rotterdams Dagblad newspaper saying, "I am also in favour of a cold war with Islam. I see Islam as an extraordinary threat, as a hostile religion." In the TV program Business class, Fortuyn said that Muslims in the Netherlands did not accept Dutch society; he believed that the religion of Islam was fundamentally intolerant and incompatible with Western values. He said that Muslims in the Netherlands needed to accept living together with the Dutch, and that if this was unacceptable for them, then they were free to leave. His concluding words in the TV program were "... I want to live together with the Muslim people, but it takes two to tango." Fortuyn also maintained that he did not object to Muslim immigrants because of their race or ethnicity, and was not against a multi-racial society, but opposed what he saw as lack of integration and unwillingness to adapt to Dutch standards of modernity and social liberalism within Muslim communities. 
  

On 9 February 2002, additional statements made by him were carried in the Volkskrant. He said that the Netherlands, with a population of 16 million, had enough inhabitants, and the practice of allowing as many as 40,000 asylum-seekers into the country each year had to be stopped. The actual number for 2001 was 27,000, down slightly on the previous year. He claimed that if he became part of the next government, he would pursue a restrictive immigration policy while also granting citizenship to a large group of illegal immigrants.

He said that he did not intend to "unload our Moroccan hooligans" onto the Moroccan King Hassan. Hassan had died three years earlier. He considered Article 7 of the constitution, which asserts freedom of speech, of more importance than Article 1, which forbids discrimination on the basis of religion, life principles, political inclination, race, or sexual preference. Fortuyn distanced himself from Hans Janmaat of the Centrum Democraten, who in the 1980s wanted to remove all foreigners from the country and was repeatedly convicted for discrimination and hate speech.

Fortuyn proposed that all people who already resided in the Netherlands would be allowed to stay, provided the immigrants adopted the Dutch society's consensus on human rights as their own. He stated: "not integrating means leaving" and "the borders have to be hermetically closed". He said "If it were legally possible, I'd say no more Muslims will get in here", claiming that the influx of Muslims would threaten freedoms in the liberal Dutch society. He thought Muslim culture had never undergone a process of modernisation and therefore still lacked acceptance of democracy and women's, gays', lesbians' and minorities' rights.

When asked by the Dutch newspaper Volkskrant whether he hated Islam, he replied:

I don't hate Islam. I consider it a backward culture. I have travelled much in the world. And wherever Islam rules, it's just terrible. All the hypocrisy. It's a bit like those old Reformed Protestants. The Reformed lie all the time. And why is that? Because they have standards and values that are so high that you can't humanly maintain them. You also see that in that Muslim culture. Then look at the Netherlands. In what country could an electoral leader of such a large movement as mine be openly homosexual? How wonderful that that's possible. That's something that one can be proud of. And I'd like to keep it that way, thank you very much.

Fortuyn used the word achterlijk, literally meaning "backward", but commonly used as an insult in the sense of "retarded". After his use of "achterlijk" caused an uproar, Fortuyn said he had used the word with its literal meaning of "backward".

Fortuyn wrote  Against the Islamization of Our Culture (1997) (in Dutch).

Fortuynism

The ideology or political style that is derived from Pim Fortuyn, and in turn the LPF, is often called Fortuynism. Observers variously saw him as a political protest targeting the alleged elitism and bureaucratic style of the Dutch purple coalitions or as offering an appealing political style. The style was characterized variously as one "of openness, directness and clearness", populism or simply as charisma. Another school holds Fortuynism as a distinct ideology, with an alternative vision of society. Some argued that Fortuynism was not just one ideology, but contained liberalism, populism and nationalism.

During the 2002 campaign, Fortuyn was accused by some of being on the "extreme right", although others saw only certain similarities. While he employed anti-immigration rhetoric, he considered himself neither a radical nationalist nor a defender of traditional authoritarian values. On the contrary, Fortuyn claimed he wanted to protect the socio-culturally liberal values of the Netherlands, women's rights and sexual minorities (he was openly gay himself), from the "backward" Islamic culture. He held liberal views favouring the drug policy of the Netherlands, same-sex marriage, euthanasia, and related positions. Fortuyn was also a member of the Republican Society, and favoured a US-style system with an elected president, elected mayors and police commissioners. He also expressed support for the state of Israel throughout his political career.

The LPF also won support from some ethnic minorities; one of Fortuyn's closest associates was of Cape Verdean origin, and one of the party's MPs was a young woman of Turkish descent.

His ideology comprised the following positions:

 Civil liberties
 Classical liberalism
 Criticism of Islam
 Deregulation
 Direct democracy
 Euroscepticism
 Freedom of speech
 Laissez-faire
 LGBT rights
 Republicanism
 Secularism
 Separation of church and state
 Small government
 Women's rights

Criticism

Fortuyn was compared with the politicians Jörg Haider and Jean-Marie Le Pen in the foreign press. These comparisons were often referred to by Dutch reporters and politicians. An explicit comparison with Le Pen was made by Ad Melkert, then lijsttrekker of the Labour Party, who said in Emmen on 24 April 2002: "If you flirt with Fortuyn, then in the Netherlands the same thing will happen as happened in France. There they woke up with Le Pen, soon we will wake up with Fortuyn."

On 5 May, the day before the assassination, Fortuyn in a debate with Melkert organized by the Algemeen Dagblad newspaper claimed that he was demonized. In it he said that he often had to tell journalists that the image created of him in the media was incorrect.

Columnist Jan Blokker wrote that "[a]fter reading [...] I realized once again that Professor Pim may really be called the Jean-Marie Le Pen, the Filip Dewinter, the Jörg Haider and the new Hans Janmaat of the Netherlands." Prime Minister Wim Kok accused Fortuyn of stirring up fear and stimulating xenophobia among the Dutch people. In the run-up to the 2002 election, GroenLinks leader Paul Rosenmöller claimed Fortuyn's policies were "not just right but extreme right".

Fortuyn often responded to criticism by stating that his views were misunderstood or distorted by the media, and in turn rejected comparisons and expressed his personal distaste for radical far-right politicians in other European countries. He explicitly distanced himself from Jean-Marie Le Pen and criticised some of his policies, including Le Pen's downplaying of the Holocaust. In domestic politics, Fortuyn also distanced his views from hard-right Dutch politicians such as Hans Janmaat and Joop Glimmerveen (who called for the mass expulsion of foreigners from the Netherlands) by maintaining that if he came to power, he would pardon existing illegal immigrants if they had lived in the Netherlands for over five years and offer them a path to citizenship if they could be assimilated into society.

In an interview on the Dutch talk show Jensen! that was broadcast shortly before his death, Fortuyn accused members of the Dutch government and political establishment of putting his life in danger through repeatedly demonizing him and his beliefs.

Legacy

Fortuyn changed the Dutch political landscape. The 2002 elections, only weeks after Fortuyn's death, were marked by large losses for the liberal People's Party for Freedom and Democracy and especially the social democratic Labour Party (whose parliamentary group was halved in size); both parties replaced their leaders shortly after their losses. The election winners were the Pim Fortuyn List, and the Christian democratic Christian Democratic Appeal (CDA) whose leader Jan Peter Balkenende went on to become Prime Minister. Some commentators in the mainstream political class speculated that Fortuyn's perceived martyrdom created greater support for the LPF, hence that party's brief surge to 17% of the electoral vote and 26 of the 150 seats in the Dutch Parliament. Others opined that voters who would have otherwise supported the LPF had Fortuyn not been murdered voted for the CDA as Balkenende had not joined in with other party leaders in attacking Fortuyn. Balkenende later claimed to have shared some of Fortuyn's opinions and pledged to implement some of his policy ideas. Although the LPF was able to form a coalition with the Christian Democratic Appeal and the People's Party for Freedom and Democracy, it was bereft with internal strife and quickly lost steam. The coalition cabinet of Jan Peter Balkenende fell within three months, due to infighting within the LPF. In the following elections, the LPF was left with only eight seats in parliament (out of 150) and was not included in the new government. Many of the LPF's successive leaders were not regarded as charismatic as Fortuyn and as the next cabinet under Balkenende continued many of the former coalition's policies, it became harder for the LPF to present an alternative image to the government. However, political commentators speculated that discontented voters might vote for a non-traditional party, if a viable alternative was at hand. Later, the right-wing Party for Freedom, which has a strong stance on immigration, proposing to deport criminal, unemployed or not assimilated non-western immigrants, won nine (out of 150) seats in the 2006 elections and peaked at 24 in 2010.

The Netherlands has made its asylum policy more strict. Opponents of Fortuynism, such as Paul Rosenmöller, Thom de Graaf, and Ad Melkert (all labelling Fortuyn as a right-wing extremist), have objected to what they think is a harsher political and social climate, especially towards immigrants and Muslims.

However, other commentators such as Ayaan Hirsi Ali, David Starkey and Douglas Murray have retrospectively defended some of Fortuyn's beliefs. Former Dutch Prime Minister Jan Peter Balkenende also stated that he later agreed with some of Fortuyn's criticisms of multiculturalism and the purple coalition under Wim Kok.

Contemporary Dutch politics is more polarized than it has been in recent years, especially on the issues for which Fortuyn was best known. People debate the success of their multicultural society, and whether they need to better assimilate newcomers. The government's decision in 2004 to more strictly expel asylum seekers whose applications had failed was controversial. Fortuyn had advocated for a one-time amnesty for those asylum seekers who had resided in the Netherlands for an extended period.

In 2004, in a TV show, Fortuyn was chosen as De Grootste Nederlander ("Greatest Dutchman of all-time"), followed closely by William of Orange, the leader of the independence war that established the precursor to the present-day Netherlands. The election was not considered representative, as it was held by viewers' voting through the internet and by phoning in. Theo van Gogh had been murdered a few days before by a Muslim, which likely affected people's voting in the TV contest for Fortuyn. The program later revealed that William of Orange had received the most votes, but many could not be counted until after the official closing time of the television show (and the proclamation of the winner), due to technical problems. The official rules of the show said that votes counted before the end of the show would be decisive, but it was suggested that all votes correctly cast before the closing of the vote would be counted. Following the official rules, the outcome was not changed.

Right-wing politicians gained greater public influence after Fortuyn's death, such as former Minister for Integration & Immigration Rita Verdonk, the prominent critic of Islam, Member of the House of Representatives Geert Wilders who in 2006 formed the Party for Freedom (which became the second largest party in the House of Representatives in 2017) and Thierry Baudet, leader of the Forum for Democracy party. These politicians often focus on the debate over cultural assimilation and integration.

Supporters of Fortuyn went on to set up the annual Pim Fortuyn Prize which is awarded to opinion makers, politicians or commentators who best convey the ideas of Pim Fortuyn. Winners have included Ebru Umar and John van den Heuvel.

Selected publications
 Het zakenkabinet Fortuyn (A.W. Bruna, 1994)
 Beklemmend Nederland (A.W. Bruna, 1995),
 Uw baan staat op de tocht!: Het einde van de overlegeconomie (A.W. Bruna, 1995) (
 Mijn collega komt zo bij u (A.W. Bruna, 1996),
 Tegen de islamisering van onze cultuur: Nederlandse identiteit als fundament (A.W. Bruna, 1997),
 Zielloos Europa (Bruna, 1997),
 50 jaar Israel, hoe lang nog?: Tegen het tolereren van fundamentalisme (Bruna, 1998),
 De derde revolutie (bruna, 1999)
 De verweesde samenleving (Karakter Uitgevers, 2002)
 De puinhopen van acht jaar Paars (Karakter Uitgevers, 2002),

See also

 06/05, a film based upon the murder of Pim Fortuyn
 The song "Feint" by Epica was made right after and about Pim Fortuyn's death

Notes

References

Citations

Bibliography

Merijn Oudenampsen, 2018, De Conservatieve Revolte — Een Ideeëngeschiedenis van de Fortuynopstand, Uitgeverij Vantilt, Nijmegen

External links

 Dr. W.S.P. (Pim) Fortuijn Parlement & Politiek

1948 births
2002 deaths
Assassinated Dutch politicians
Christian critics of Islam
Critics of multiculturalism
Deaths by firearm in the Netherlands
Dutch civil servants
Dutch corporate directors
Dutch critics of Islam
Dutch educators
Dutch political consultants
Dutch political philosophers
Dutch political party founders
Dutch publishers (people)
Dutch republicans
Dutch Roman Catholics
Dutch sociologists
Critical theorists
Academic staff of Erasmus University Rotterdam
Free speech activists
Gay politicians
Dutch gay writers
Islam-related controversies in Europe
Islam in the Netherlands
Leaders of political parties in the Netherlands
Dutch LGBT broadcasters
LGBT conservatism
Dutch LGBT politicians
Dutch LGBT rights activists
LGBT Roman Catholics
LGBT history in the Netherlands
Livable Netherlands politicians
Livable Rotterdam politicians
Economic sociologists
Academic staff of Maastricht University
Municipal councillors of Rotterdam
Academic staff of Nyenrode Business University
Party chairs of the Netherlands
People from Velsen
People murdered in the Netherlands
Pim Fortuyn List politicians
21st-century Dutch politicians
Political controversies in the Netherlands
Political science writers
University of Groningen alumni
Academic staff of the University of Groningen
Vrije Universiteit Amsterdam alumni
Writers about direct democracy
Writers about globalization
Writers about communism
Writers about activism and social change
University of Amsterdam alumni
Far-right politics
Former Marxists